UK North was an English bus operator in Manchester. In early 2005, it revived the GM Buses name. It operated services including on routes 42, 86 and 192.

However, this was to be short lived as services were suspended during the 2006 Christmas period, over safety fears after several buses were involved in accidents. These included a man 
who was killed in an incident involving a UK North bus.

UK North were found to have been engaging in unsafe work practices with two managers jailed.

References

External links

Flickr gallery

2007 disestablishments in England
Former bus operators in Greater Manchester